The Mighty Leaf Tea Company is a specialty tea manufacturer and distributor based in Emeryville, California. Mighty Leaf Tea was founded by husband and wife team, Gary Shinner and Jill Portman in 1996.

The company distributes tea through wholesale, retail, and online sales channels. Mighty Leaf sells both whole-leaf tea pouches and loose-leaf tea including black, oolong, green, white, and herbal teas.

In 2007, Cooks Illustrated magazine named Mighty Leaf Organic Breakfast tea, as the “plain black tea."

In August 2014, Mighty Leaf Tea was acquired by Peet's Coffee & Tea, which is owned by JAB Holding Company.

Tasting Table placed Mighty Leaf Tea in second place in Green Tea Brands, Ranked.

Notes

References
New York Times - Teas Got a Brand New Bag - 09/06
San Francisco Chronicle - Entrepreneurs see a lifestyle in their tea leaves - 10/03

Tea brands in the United States
Food manufacturers of the United States
Mighty Leaf Tea Company